The Naughty Flirt is a 1931 American pre-Code romantic comedy film directed by Edward Cline and starring Alice White, Paul Page and Myrna Loy.

Plot
Attorney Alan Ward (Paul Page) is fed up with the reckless behavior of spoiled heiress Kay Elliott (Alice White) – the daughter of the head of his law firm – who is in love with him.  Stung by his rejection, she eventually tells him to "Go jump in the lake."  Seeing a chance to make up the money they lost in the stock market crash, a fortune-hunting brother and sister, Jack and Linda Gregory (Douglas Gilmore and Myrna Loy), get Kay to agree to marry Jack.  At the altar, she announces that she still loves Alan, and he comes to his senses and realizes he loves her too.

Cast
Alice White as Katherine Constance "Kay" Elliott
Paul Page as Alan Joseph Ward
Myrna Loy as Linda Gregory
Robert Agnew as Wilbur Fairchild
Douglas Gilmore as John Thomas "Jack" Gregory
George Irving as John Raleigh Elliott
Sayre Dearing as Kay's Friend (uncredited)
Geraldine Dvorak as Party Guest (uncredited)
Thelma Hill as Friend (uncredited)
Lloyd Ingraham as Judge Drake (uncredited)
Jane Keckley as Office Cleaning Woman (uncredited)
Fred Kelsey as Policeman in Paddy Wagon (uncredited)
Marian Marsh as Kay's Friend (uncredited)

Production
The film features one of Myrna Loy's early roles. Loy was 26 at the time and this was her last Warner Bros. film before moving on to Sam Goldwyn, then 20th Century Fox for a year, finally settling at MGM. Alice White, on the other hand, had already passed the prime of her career, which started in 1927.

Reception
Press reception to the film was not positive, with The New York Times writing "It is as difficult to find something to praise as it is to find a needle in a haystack," and Variety echoing that the film "can be reduced to a dumb number falling for a guy that's hard to get and getting him... Four starting points and even more endings."

Preservation status
The Naughty Flirt is preserved in the Library of Congress collection Packard Campus for Audio-Visual Conservation.

References

External links

1931 films
1931 romantic comedy films
American romantic comedy films
American black-and-white films
Warner Bros. films
Films directed by Edward F. Cline
1930s English-language films
1930s American films